The women's long jump at the 2013 Southeast Asian Games was held in Naypyidaw, Myanmar. The track and field events took place at the Wunna Theikdi Stadiumon December 18.

Schedule
All times are Myanmar Standard Time (UTC+06:30)

Records

Results 
Legend
X — Failure
NM — No Mark
DNS — Did Not Start

References

Athletics at the 2013 Southeast Asian Games
2013 in women's athletics